Cari Groce is a former coach of Texas Tech's women's tennis team. Her time coaching the team ended before the 2008/09 season. Her record with the Lady Raiders stands at 58–44 with only a single winning season in the Big 12.

Groce played tennis at the University of Nebraska where she became the first All-American in school history in 1986.

Groce is the daughter of Ike Groce, who was inducted into the Texas Tennis Hall of Fame in 1982.

References

Living people
Nebraska Cornhuskers women's tennis players
Texas Tech Red Raiders women's tennis coaches
People from Stillwater, Oklahoma
Year of birth missing (living people)
American female tennis players
American tennis coaches
Tennis people from Oklahoma